Malaxa is a village in the Chania regional unit on Crete in Greece. The 2011 census counted a population of 115 people in the village. In ancient times the Malaxa area was under the sphere of influence of the nearby powerful city of Kydonia. Malaxa lies on the feet of the Lefka Ori, and is separated from the large city of Chania by the Chania Plain.

Notes

References
 The area of Mournies
 C. Michael Hogan, Cydonia, The Modern Antiquarian, Jan. 23, 2008

Populated places in Chania (regional unit)